Give Us a Break is the first album by the North Carolina band Arrogance, released in 1973 (see 1973 in music). Only 300 copies of this album were pressed on Sugarbush Records, based in Chapel Hill.

Track listing
Side One
"Not Unusual" (Kirkland)  – 2:44
"Searchin'" (Kirkland) - 5:01
"To See Her Smile" (Kirkland) - 5:38
"Our Love Will Last" (Dixon) - 2:57
"Ma and Pa" (Kirkland) - 3:10
"Why Do You Love Me" (Dixon) - 3:40
Side Two
"A Foreshadowing" (Dixon) - 4:51
"I Can See It In Your Eyes" (Kirkland) - 2:25
"Pirates, Princes, and Kings" (Dixon) - 3:30
"Congratulations" (Kirkland) - 3:56

Bonus tracks on 2000 CD reissue
"Black Death" - 3:24
"Race With The Devil" - 3:04

Personnel 
Arrogance
Don Dixon – bass, vocals
Robert Kirkland – guitars, vocals
Marty Stout – keyboards
Ogie Shaw – bongos, percussion
Rob Thorne - drums

References

Arrogance (band) albums
1973 debut albums